The 1952 NBA draft was the sixth annual draft of the National Basketball Association (NBA). The draft was held on April 26, 1952, before the 1952–53 season. In this draft, ten remaining NBA teams took turns selecting amateur U.S. college basketball players. In each round, the teams selected in reverse order of their win–loss record in the previous season, except for the defending champion, the Minneapolis Lakers, who was assigned the last pick of each round. The draft consisted of 17 rounds comprising 106 players selected.

Draft selections and draftee career notes
Mark Workman from West Virginia University was selected first overall by the Milwaukee Hawks. Bill Mlkvy from Temple University was selected before the draft as Philadelphia Warriors' territorial pick. Don Meineke from the University of Dayton was selected by the Fort Wayne Pistons in the second round and went on to win the inaugural Rookie of the Year Award. The ninth pick of the draft, Clyde Lovellette from University of Kansas, was the only player from that draft to make it to an NBA All-Star Game at least once and to have been inducted to the Basketball Hall of Fame.

Tenth-round pick Gene Conley played both professional basketball and baseball. He played six seasons in the NBA for the Boston Celtics and the New York Knicks as well as 11 seasons in the Major League Baseball (MLB). He won three NBA championships with the Celtics as well as the 1957 World Series with the Milwaukee Braves, becoming the only athlete to win world championships in both basketball and baseball.

Dick Groat from Duke was picked 3rd overall by the Fort Wayne Pistons and went on to win the National League 1960 MVP, and two World Series championships while playing shortstop for the Pittsburgh Pirates and then the St. Louis Cardinals.

Key

Draft

Other picks
The following list includes other draft picks who have appeared in at least one NBA game.

Notable undrafted players
These players were not selected in the 1952 draft but played at least one game in the NBA.

See also
 List of first overall NBA draft picks

References
General

Specific

External links
NBA.com
NBA.com: NBA Draft History

Draft
National Basketball Association draft
NBA draft
NBA draft
1950s in Minneapolis
Basketball in Minneapolis
Events in Minneapolis